The Santa Maria Nuova Crucifixion is a 1440-1441 fresco fragment by Andrea del Castagno in the Ospedale di Santa Maria Nuova in Florence.

It is recorded in the Libro di Antonio Billi, Vasari and the anonymous Gaddiano, confirming it as being by del Castagno. Berti relates the work to that painter's 1442 frescoes of San Zaccaria in Venice, so much so that he theorised that the same studio assistant to the master worked on the Venetian church, Francesco da Faenza. It shows saint Romauld and saint Benedict at the far left and right, which in 1982 Barucca used to link it to a commission from the Camaldolese monastery of Santa Maria degli Angeli, some of whose rooms were merged into Santa Maria Nuova in 1870.

While the work was being removed from the wall a fire destroyed the lower half of the fresco, meaning Tintori had to reconstruct it using earlier archive photographs. The work's sinopia is incomplete and also held in the Soprintendenza store.

References

Fresco paintings in Florence
1441 paintings
Paintings of Benedict of Nursia
Paintings depicting the Crucifixion of Jesus
Paintings of the Virgin Mary
Paintings depicting John the Apostle
Paintings depicting Mary Magdalene
Paintings by Andrea del Castagno
Paintings of Saint Romuald